SOS (formerly She's Only Sixteen) is a 4-piece alternative rock band from the Philippines. The band is composed of Roberto Seña on lead vocals and rhythm guitar, Andrew Panopio on lead guitar, Anjo Silvoza on bass, and King Puentespina on drums.

History

2008-2012: Formation and early years 

In their sophomore year of high school at the Ateneo de Manila, Roberto Seña and Anjo Silvoza were members of False Targets, a band which loosely experimented with rap and hip-hop and covered artists such as Lady Gaga and the Jonas Brothers. When the lead vocalist of False Targets left, Seña took the role of both vocalist and rhythm guitarist and renamed the band 'She's Only Sixteen', after the Red Hot Chili Peppers' song 'She's Only 18'.

Now lacking a lead guitarist, Seña invited his friend Andrew Panopio to join, as he and Seña shared similar tastes in music. However, shortly after gaining a lead guitarist, their drummer, Kevin Santos, had to leave for the United States, so Seña looked to other bands for temporary sessionists. He asked members of Imelda (another band from Ateneo) if they could borrow their drummer, who at the time was King Puentespina, to session for She's Only Sixteen for a while. Eventually, since King was sessioning more and more for She's Only Sixteen, he decided to leave Imelda and join She's Only Sixteen as their permanent drummer.

2012: She's Only Sixteen EP 

In 2012, She's Only Sixteen was signed to Universal Records under Orion Entertainment Philippines where they released their self-titled EP on September 28, 2012 with their debut single 'Dying to Meet You'. It was well received by fans and critics alike, and even scored number two on ABS-CBN's 'Top 10 Pinoy Albums of 2012'

Riding on the success of the EP, She's Only Sixteen would go on to perform at numerous major local events such as the first Wanderland Music and Arts Festival and the first Satchmi Vinyl day in 2013. They also performed internationally at Baybeats 2015 in Singapore.

Although they continued to release new music and demos under their Soundcloud, they were unable to 'legally' release new content due to their label tampering with the band's creative control, thus delaying their announced debut album's release by 5 years.

2017-2020: Whatever That Was 

In the 5 years that they weren't able to release music through a label, the band fell into a "weird stagnant place". They continued to play gigs and release demos (through SoundCloud, which were then deleted before the release of their album) but none of their new material really stuck with them. Also, being fresh college graduates, they now had different priorities and schedules to deal with.

Despite busy schedules and day jobs, the band still found time to focus on their music. In that time, they were able to develop their personal sound and grow out of their EP, which was largely influenced by foreign artists such as The Strokes and Arctic Monkeys, whom they were very frequently compared and attributed to.

Their debut album entitled 'Whatever That Was' was released on September 30, 2017 under local independent label Party Bear Records.

Seña's songwriting for 'Whatever That Was' departs from their self-titled EP's youthful romantic themes and ventures towards much more mature realities about working out relationships, being alone, and the struggle of adult life. Their sound also hints at their maturity as a band, as they have experimented and incorporated different styles and genres such as jazz, shoegaze and a little bit of samba.

A few days after its release, 9 songs out of 11 were on the Spotify Philippines Viral Chart, with their single 'Magic' claiming the number 1 spot for nearly a week.

On November 25, 2017, the band released a music video directed by Jorel Lising for their 2nd single 'Magic' on Party Bear Record's YouTube channel.

2020-present: Currently, The Other Side EP 
On May 1, 2020, the band released their new single, "Currently" on social media streaming platforms. After almost three years without new music, the band embarked on a new journey and venturing on new sound with their music.

Two singles for The Other Side EP, "Broken Glass" was released on September 25, 2020, and "Good Company" was released on November 6, 2020. The EP was released on November 27, 2020.

Members

Current
 Roberto Seña - lead vocals, rhythm guitar, keys
 Andrew Panopio - backup vocals and lead guitar
 Anjo Silvoza - bass
 King Puentespina - drums

Former
 Kevin Santos - drums

Discography

EPs
She's Only Sixteen (2012)
The Other Side (2020)
Broken Glass (Remixes) (2021)

Studio albums
Whatever That Was (2017)

Singles

References

Filipino rock music groups
Musical groups from Manila
Musical groups established in 2008